Fernando Lopes may refer to:

 Fernando Lopes (filmmaker) (1935–2012), Portuguese film director
 Fernando Lopes Alcântara (born 1987), Brazilian footballer
 Fernando Lopes-Graça (1906–1994), Portuguese composer and conductor
 Fernão Lopes (c. 1385–after 1459), Portuguese chronicler
 Fernão Lopes (soldier) (died 1545), first known permanent inhabitant of the remote Island of Saint Helena
 Fernando Lopes (swimmer) (born 1964), Angolan swimmer

See also
 Fernando López (disambiguation)